The Order of the Companions of Honour is an order of the Commonwealth realms. It was founded on 4 June 1917 by King George V as a reward for outstanding achievements. It was founded on the same date as the Order of the British Empire.

The order was originally intended to be conferred upon a limited number of persons for whom this special distinction seemed to be the most appropriate form of recognition, constituting an honour dissociated from either the acceptance of title or the classification of merit. It is now described as being "awarded for having a major contribution to the arts, science, medicine, or government lasting over a long period of time". The first recipients of the order were all decorated for "services in connection with the war" and were listed in The London Gazette.

Composition

The order consists of the monarch of the Commonwealth realms, who is the Sovereign of the Order of the Companions of Honour, and a maximum of 65 members. Additionally, foreigners or Commonwealth citizens from outside the Commonwealth realms may be added as honorary members. Members are organised into a single class and are appointed by the monarch of the Commwealth realms in their capacity as sovereign of the order. While membership of the order confers no title or precedence, those inducted into the order are entitled to use the post-nominal letters CH.

Appointments to the order are generally made on the advice of prime ministers of the Commonwealth realms. For Canadians, the advice to the Sovereign can come from a variety of officials. Originally, the order was limited to 50 ordinary members, but in 1943 it was enlarged to 65, with a quota of 45 members for the United Kingdom, seven for Australia, two each for New Zealand and South Africa, and nine for India, Burma, and the other British colonies. The quota numbers were altered in 1970 to 47 for the United Kingdom, seven for Australia, two for New Zealand, and nine for other Commonwealth realms. The quota was adjusted again in 1975 by adding two places to the New Zealand quota and reducing the nine for the other countries to seven.

While still able to nominate candidates to the order, the Cabinet of Australia has effectively stopped the allocation of this award to that country's citizens in preference to other Australian honours. The last Australian member, Doug Anthony, former Deputy Prime Minister of Australia, died on 20 December 2020. Companions from other Commonwealth realms continue to be appointed, Dame Kiri Te Kanawa, a New Zealand soprano, was given the award in 2018 and Canadian author Margaret Atwood was given the award in 2019.

Insignia
The insignia of the order is in the form of an oval medallion, surmounted by a royal crown (but, until recently, surmounted by an imperial crown), and with a rectangular panel within, depicting on it an oak tree, a shield with the Royal Arms of the United Kingdom hanging from one branch, and, on the left, a mounted knight in armour. The insignia's blue border bears in gold letters the motto IN ACTION FAITHFUL AND IN HONOUR CLEAR, Alexander Pope's description (in iambic pentameter) in his Epistle to Mr Addison of James Craggs, later used on Craggs's monument in Westminster Abbey. Men wear the badge on a neck ribbon (red with golden border threads) and women on a bow at the left shoulder.

Current members
 Sovereign: King Charles III

Honorary members

See also
 List of members of the Order of the Companions of Honour
 List of honorary British knights and dames
 List of people who have declined a British honour

Notes

References

 
Companions of Honour, Order of the